Sir John Taylor Coleridge (9 July 1790 – 11 February 1876) was an English judge, the second son of Captain James Coleridge and nephew of the poet Samuel Taylor Coleridge.

Life
He was born at Tiverton, Devon, and was educated as a Colleger (King's Scholar) at Eton College, and in 1809 gained a scholarship at Corpus Christi College, Oxford. At Corpus Christi, John Keble became a close friend. Coleridge won the Chancellor's Prize for Latin verse in 1810, graduated first-class in classics in 1812, won the prizes for English and Latin essays in 1813 (as Keble had done in 1811), and became a Vinerian Scholar and a fellow of Exeter College. In 1819 he was called to the bar at the Middle Temple and practised for some years on the western circuit.

In 1824, on William Gifford's retirement, he assumed the editorship of the Quarterly Review, resigning it a year afterwards in favour of John Gibson Lockhart. In 1825 he published a well regarded edition of William Blackstone's Commentaries, and in 1832 he was made a serjeant-at-law and recorder of Exeter. In 1835 he was appointed one of the judges of the King's Bench. In 1852 his university created him a DCL, and in 1858 he resigned his judgeship, and was made a member of the Privy Council, entitling him to sit on the Judicial Committee of the Privy Council. In 1869, he produced his Memoir of the Rev. John Keble, whose friend he had been since their college days, a third edition of which was issued within a year. He died at Ottery St. Mary, Devon, leaving two sons and two daughters.

Coleridge was a member of the Canterbury Association from 24 June 1851.

Leading cases as judge
Stockdale v. Hansard

Family
John married Mary Buchanan at St Peter's, Woodmansterne, Surrey, in 1818; her father, Gilbert Buchanan, was then rector there. John's eldest son, John Duke Coleridge, 1st Baron Coleridge, became Lord Chief Justice of England. The second son, Henry James Coleridge (1822–1893), left the Anglican for the Roman Catholic church in 1852, and became well known as a Jesuit divine, editor of The Month, and author of numerous theological works. His daughter Alethea Buchanan Coleridge (1826–1909) married John Fielder Mackarness, Bishop of Oxford, in 1849. Sir John Taylor Coleridge's brothers were James Duke Coleridge and Henry Nelson Coleridge, the latter the husband of Sara Coleridge. His brother Francis George was the father of Arthur Duke Coleridge (born 1830), clerk of assizes on the Midland circuit and author of Eton in the Forties and whose daughter Mary E. Coleridge became a well-known writer of fiction.

Notes

References

External links

1790 births
1876 deaths
People from Tiverton, Devon
English barristers
Justices of the King's Bench
People educated at Eton College
Alumni of Corpus Christi College, Oxford
John Taylor
Fellows of Exeter College, Oxford
Serjeants-at-law (England)
Members of the Privy Council of the United Kingdom
Members of the Canterbury Association
Members of the Judicial Committee of the Privy Council
19th-century English judges
Lawyers from Devon